Bruce Township may refer to:

Canada 
 Bruce Township, Ontario

United States
 Bruce Township, LaSalle County, Illinois
 Bruce Township, Benton County, Iowa
 Bruce Township, Chippewa County, Michigan
 Bruce Township, Macomb County, Michigan
 Bruce Township, Minnesota
 Bruce Township, Guilford County, North Carolina, in Guilford County, North Carolina
 Bruce Township, Cavalier County, North Dakota, in Cavalier County, North Dakota

Township name disambiguation pages